Great Lakes Energy is a Solar EPC company founded by Sam Dargan in 2005. The company is headquartered  in Kigali, Rwanda and primarily serves the East African market. The company is  specialized in on-grid and off-grid solar energy systems. For the past decade, the company has immersed in understanding and solving the energy challenges of those in East Africa. Today we use that knowledge and experience to design, build, and maintain solar power systems that are more reliable, more sustainable, and more affordable. The company provides non-governmental organizations, hospitals, and schools with optimized photovoltaic systems. The company has specialized in retrofitting existing off-grid PV solar system designs with optimized versions. In the past the company has also provided jobs for training local Rwandans on how to engineer and install these systems. The company also has provided training to other social entrepreneurs learning to operate in Africa.

Great Lakes Energy became the distributor for Sun King lamps by Green Light Energy in 2013 allowing it to provide off the shelf sustainable lighting solutions for rural households in Rwanda.

In 2014 Great Lakes Energy partnered with Global Bright Light Foundation  to distribute sun king lamps to refugees in the UNHCR Kiziba  refugee camp in Rwanda.

In 2016 Great Lakes Energy became the official distributor of Victron Energy https://www.victronenergy.com/

Health Clinics powered by GLE 
Gikomero
Mukuyu
Nyange
Nyarugenge HC
Massoro HC

C&I scale done by GLE 
283KWp at KTF concept, Bujumbura-Burundi
100KWp at Norrsken Kigali House
60KWp at Hope Haven School
100KWp re-install at King Faisal Hospital
35KWp at the Retreat

See also
 Solar power in Africa
 Energy in Rwanda
 Off-the-grid
 Renewable energy in Africa

References

External links
 (Affiliated Website)

Organizations established in 2005
Social enterprises
Energy companies of Rwanda
Solar power in Rwanda
2005 establishments in Rwanda
Organisations based in Kigali
Economy of Kigali